Luján de Cuyo is a  department located in the northwest of Mendoza Province in Argentina.

Districts

Agrelo
Carrodilla
Chacras de Coria
El Carrizal
La Puntilla
Las Compuertas
Luján de Cuyo
Mayor Drummond
Perdriel
Potrerillos
Ugarteche
Vistalba

See also
Mendoza wine

External links

  Municipal Site (Spanish)
Satellelite Photograph of Luján de Cuyo
Tourist Guide (Spanish)

1855 establishments in Argentina
Departments of Mendoza Province